Oleksandr Vasylyovych Petrakov (born 6 August 1957) is a Ukrainian professional football manager, who formerly played as defender. He is currently the coach of the Armenia national team.

Career

Playing career
Born in Kyiv, Petrakov is a product of the local Dynamo Kyiv youth sportive school system. He played for the Soviet third tier sides of Ukrainian group such as Lokomotyv Vinnytsia (1976–1978), SKA Kyiv (1978–1979), Dnipro Cherkasy (1979–1980), Avanhard Rivne (1981–1982), Kolos Nikopol (1983–1984). In 1986 Petrakov went abroad to play for the Soviet Southern Group of Forces team in Budapest, Hungary (1986–1990). In 1978 and 1991 he played for couple of amateur clubs like Bilshovyk Kyiv and Budivelnyk Ivankiv (near Chernobyl).

Coaching career
In his coaching career were included: amateur side Budivelnyk Ivankiv (1991–1993, head coach), top tier Torpedo Zaporizhzhia (1993–1994, assistant coach), several second tier clubs like CSKA-2 Kyiv (1996–1998, assistant coach; 1998–1999, head coach), Spartak Sumy (2000–2001, head coach), FC Vinnytsia (2001, head coach), Dynamo Kyiv academy (2001–2005), amateur RVUFC Kyiv (2006–2010), different youth national teams of Ukraine (2010–2021), winning the 2019 FIFA U-20 World Cup when his side defeated South Korea 3–1 in the final. He was leading national team sides of 1996 years of birth, 1999 and 2003.

Petrakov from March 2014 possess UEFA Pro Licence.

On 17 August 2021, Petrakov was appointed as an acting coach of Ukraine for the 2022 FIFA World Cup qualifying cycle. On 12 January 2023, Petrakov left his post as manager of Ukraine.

On 14 January 2023, he became the manager of the Armenia national team.

Coaching statistics

Managerial statistics

Personal life
Petrakov is married to Irina. The couple have a daughter, Viktoria, and a son, Yevhen.

During the 2022 Russian invasion of Ukraine, Petrakov and his wife refused to flee besieged Kyiv. Petrakov tried to sign up to Ukraine’s territorial defence forces, but his lack of military experience prevented this. According to Petrakov: “I am 64 but I felt it was normal to do this. I think I could take two or three enemies out.”

Honours

Manager

Ukraine U20
FIFA U-20 World Cup: 2019

References

External links
 Profile at Soccerway 
 Profile at FFU Official Site (Ukr)

1957 births
Living people
Footballers from Kyiv
Soviet footballers
Association football defenders
Ukrainian people of Russian descent
FC Dnipro Cherkasy players
SKA Kiev players
NK Veres Rivne players
FC Elektrometalurh-NZF Nikopol players
FC Nyva Vinnytsia players
Ukrainian football managers
Ukrainian Premier League managers
FC Nyva Vinnytsia managers
FC Spartak Sumy managers
FC CSKA Kyiv managers
Ukraine national football team managers
Armenia national football team managers
Ukrainian expatriate football managers
Expatriate football managers in Armenia
Ukrainian expatriate sportspeople in Armenia